Helena Pielichaty (pronounced Pierre-li-hatty), author of children's books, was born in Stockholm, Sweden in 1955, but most of her childhood was spent in Yorkshire. As a result, she became a supporter of Huddersfield Town F.C. Pielichaty lives in Nottinghamshire with her husband and two children.

Pielichaty began her career as a teacher and did not start writing until she was 32. Since then, Pielichaty has written many books published by the Oxford University Press.

Bibliography
2008
Accidental Friends

2009
The first 6 books in the Girls FC series by Walker

References

External links
 Official site

1955 births
Living people
Writers from Stockholm
Swedish children's writers
Swedish women children's writers
Swedish emigrants to the United Kingdom